Team Mystique are a junior-level synchronized skating team from Helsinki, Finland, representing the figure skating club Helsingfors Skridskoklubb. The club is also home to the senior team, Team Unique. They have placed second twice at the Junior World Challenge Cup.

Competitive results (1998–2008)

Competitive results (2008–14)

References

External links
Official website of Team Mystique

Junior synchronized skating teams
Sports teams in Finland
Figure skating in Finland
Sports clubs in Helsinki